Percy Henry Collick (16 November 1897 – 24 July 1984) was a British Labour Party politician and trade union official.

Originally a railway fireman with the Southern Railway, he was a member of the Associated Society of Locomotive Engineers and Firemen, serving as organising secretary from 1934 to 1940 and assistant general secretary from 1940 to his retirement in 1957.

He was an unsuccessful candidate at the 1929 general election in the safe Conservative constituency of Reigate in Surrey, coming third with 20.9% of the votes. He stood again in Reigate at the 1931 general election, when there was no Liberal candidate, and he came second with only 17.3% of the vote, a Conservative majority of over 65%. He did not contest the 1935 general election.

In the Labour landslide at the 1945 general election, he was elected as Member of Parliament for the Merseyside constituency of Birkenhead West, overturning the previous Conservative majority of 3,753 with a swing of 13.2%.

His constituency was abolished in boundary changes for the 1950 general election, and he was returned for the new Birkenhead constituency. He held the seat until he retired from the House of Commons at the 1964 general election.

In Clement Attlee's post-war Labour government, he served as Parliamentary Secretary to the Ministry of Agriculture and Fisheries from 1945 to 1947.

References

External links 
 
Catalogue of Collick's papers, held at the Modern Records Centre, University of Warwick

1897 births
1984 deaths
Associated Society of Locomotive Engineers and Firemen-sponsored MPs
Labour Party (UK) MPs for English constituencies
UK MPs 1945–1950
UK MPs 1950–1951
UK MPs 1951–1955
UK MPs 1955–1959
UK MPs 1959–1964
English trade unionists
Southern Railway (UK) people
Ministers in the Attlee governments, 1945–1951